Janet Q. Nguyen (born May 1, 1976) is an American politician who serves in the  California State Senate. A Republican, she represents the 36th district, which includes coastal Orange County, Little Saigon, and parts of Los Angeles County. She previously was a member of the State Senate for the old 34th district from 2014 to 2018, before narrowly losing reelection to Tom Umberg.

Before her current Senate term, she was a member of the California State Assembly for the old 72nd district from 2020 to 2022, encompassing parts of northern coastal Orange County which includes the cities of Huntington Beach, Garden Grove, Westminster, Fountain Valley, Seal Beach, Los Alamitos, and the unincorporated areas of Midway City and Rossmoor.

She is the first Vietnamese-American state Senator in the United States and the country's first Vietnamese-American woman state legislator.

Prior to being elected to the state Senate, she was an Orange County Supervisor, representing the First District. At the age of 30, she was the youngest person to be elected to the board of supervisors, the first woman to be elected from the First District, and the first Vietnamese-American county supervisor in the United States.

She won her supervisor seat following a historic special election where two Vietnamese-American candidates received half of the total votes cast in a field of 10, separated from each other by only 7 votes.  She was sworn in on March 27, 2007, after a lengthy court battle.  She won a full, four-year term in 2008 in another historic election when all three major candidates were Vietnamese Americans.  She was reelected to a third term in 2012 and left the Board in 2014 after winning her first State Senate term.

Prior to her election to the Board of Supervisors, she served as a Garden Grove City Council Member and at age 28, was the youngest person ever elected to that body, until Kim Nguyen (no relation) was elected at 25 in 2016.

Personal life
Nguyen was born in Saigon, South Vietnam, on May 1, 1976, roughly one year after the Fall of Saigon on April 30, 1975. Her family joined millions of others in becoming boat people when she was five, coming to California in 1981.  They first lived in San Bernardino, but settled in Garden Grove in early 1990s.  She attended the University of California, Irvine, at first to become a doctor but later majored in political science after she was inspired by then-Supervisor Bill Steiner.  She is married to Tom Bonikowski, Jr., with whom she has two sons, Thomas III and Timothy.

2007 special election

The election of Supervisor Lou Correa to the California State Senate in the 2006 election left his supervisorial seat vacant.  Ten candidates filed for the seat in the February 6, 2007 special election, including three Vietnamese Americans, who were all Republicans.  While the 1st District Supervisorial seat is officially non-partisan, the leading candidate was California State Assemblyman Tom Umberg (who had just left office two months before), a Democrat who had the full support of the labor unions.  While the Republican Party did not officially endorse a candidate, most party leaders were backing Santa Ana City Councilman Carlos Bustamante.

With three Vietnamese-American candidates, the large Vietnamese-American community who comprise a quarter of registered voters in the First District was galvanized.  Janet Nguyen's main opponent, Garden Grove Unified School District Trustee Trung Nguyen, had the support of State Assemblyman Van Tran.  Issues that the candidates discussed included illegal immigration to the United States, one that county supervisors do not have the authority to affect.

The debate was particularly heated within the Vietnamese-American community, with accusations flying back and forth between the two Nguyen camps. Trung Nguyen was insulted as a "fob" and his campaign photoshopped Trung Nguyen in a photo next to Governor Arnold Schwarzenegger while Janet Nguyen was criticized for not being fluent in Vietnamese. Pundits speculated that the three Vietnamese-American candidates would split the Vietnamese-American vote, allowing Umberg to easily win the election.

With high absentee voter turnout among the Vietnamese-American community, it became clear on election night that Janet Nguyen and Trung Nguyen were leading.  Umberg and Bustamante were in third and fourth place, respectively, and quickly conceded defeat.  At the end of the night, Janet Nguyen was leading by 52 votes.  However, when all the votes were counted on the following day, Trung Nguyen was leading by seven votes.  Janet Nguyen requested a recount, and the final result was 10,919 votes for Janet Nguyen and 10,912 votes for Trung Nguyen.  Janet Nguyen was certified the winner.

However, Trung Nguyen's lawyers filed a lawsuit challenging the recount, alleging that the Registrar of Voters improperly voided votes for him and awarded votes to Janet Nguyen in the recount.  The Board of Supervisors postponed inaugurating Janet Nguyen pending the lawsuit.  On March 26, she was named the winner, winning by just 3 votes.  She was sworn into office on March 27, 2007.

After losing the lawsuit in the Orange County Superior Court, Trung Nguyen's lawyers filed an appeal to the California Court of Appeal for the Fourth District, Division Three.  The Court of Appeal ruled against Trung Nguyen and upheld the Superior Court's decision.  Refusing to stop there, Trung Nguyen's lawyers filed an appeal to the California Supreme Court. The California Supreme Court denied to hear the appeal.

2008 election
While special elections for Orange County Supervisor are decided by plurality vote, regular elections for Orange County Supervisor are decided by majority vote.  Should no candidate capture a majority of the vote, then the top two candidates advance to a run-off election.

In light of her initial election's closeness in 2007, it was widely expected that Janet Nguyen would be forced into a November 2008 run-off election.  However, Janet Nguyen won 56.6% of the vote in the June 2008 election, avoiding a November run-off. Garden Grove Councilwoman Dina Nguyen, a fellow Republican who received the strong support of Assemblyman Van Tran and his machine (including former candidate, Trung Nguyen), won only 27.7% of the vote while Democratic activist Hoa Van Tran won 15.7% of the vote.

2014 State Senate election

In 2014, incumbent Democratic state Senator Lou Correa was term-limited, creating a vacancy.  Republican leaders quickly rallied around Nguyen while the state Democratic establishment rallied around former state Assemblyman Jose Solorio.  The ensuing election was the most expensive in the state, and at times featured accusations and aggressive negative advertising.  The vote was expected to be close, but Nguyen won the November election by a 58% to 42% margin, surprising even her fellow Republicans.  She became the first State Senator of Vietnamese ancestry in American history.

Removal from California Senate floor

On February 23, 2017, Senator Nguyen was forcibly removed from the Senate floor during an attempt to criticize the late California Sen. Tom Hayden and called him a communist.  She rose to criticize his stance as "an outspoken critic of the Vietnam War [who] made celebrated trips to North Vietnam and Cambodia, offering to help broker a peaceful end." She spoke first in Vietnamese and then in English, all whilst repeatedly being told by presiding Sen. Ricardo Lara, D-Bell Gardens, that she was out of order. After she continued speaking her microphone was turned off.  Senator Nguyen continued anyway, and Lara later ordered a sergeant-at-arms to escort her out of the room.  The entire episode was caught on video, and elicited serious criticism from the Senate GOP Caucus, particularly in the shadow of a similar censure of U.S. Senator Elizabeth Warren during the confirmation hearings of Jeff Sessions. For her actions the Los Angeles Times referred to Nguyen as "a rising Republican star", while the Huffington Post supported the actions of the legislative body to stop Nguyen from speaking.

2018 State Senate election
In 2018, Nguyen was challenged for re-election by Democratic former state Assemblyman Tom Umberg.  In a major upset, Nguyen was narrowly defeated in the general election.

2020 State Assembly election
In 2020, Nguyen ran for the seat in California State Assembly's 72nd district. She placed first in the primary, helping unseat incumbent Republican Tyler Diep, who placed third and thus could not advance to the general election. In the general election, she defeated the Democrat, Garden Grove City Councilwoman Diedre Nguyen (no relation) by 8%.

2021 California gubernatorial recall election
In 2021, she supported the recall of the current governor of California, Gavin Newsom.

2022 State Senate election
On December 21, 2021, Nguyen announced that she would be a candidate for state Senate District 36, which is newly created. She won the November 2022 general election against Democrat Kim Carr with 56.9% of the vote.

Electoral history
2007 Special Election for Orange County Supervisor, 1st District
Janet Nguyen (R), 10,919 - 24.1%
Trung Nguyen (R), 10,912 - 24.1%
Tom Umberg (D), 9,725 - 21.4%
Carlos Bustamante (R), 7,460 - 16.5%
Mark Rosen (D), 2,181 - 4.8%
Brett Elliott Franklin (R), 1,739 - 3.8%
Kermit Marsh (R), 1,335 - 2.9%
Larry Phan (R), 417 - 0.9%
Lupe Moreno (R), 383 - 0.8%
Benny Diaz (D), 273 - 0.6%
2008 Election for Orange County Supervisor, 1st District
Janet Nguyen (R), 21,350 - 56.6%
Dina Nguyen (R), 10,465 - 27.7%
Hoa Van Tran (D), 5,928 - 15.7%
2012 Election for Orange County Supervisor, 1st District
Janet Nguyen (R), 37,106 - 74.2%
Steve Rocco (I), 12,902 - 25.8%
2014 Primary Election for California State Senator, 34th District
Janet Nguyen (R), 46,445 - 52.0%
Jose Solorio (D), 29,793 - 33.3%
Long Pham (R), 13,102 - 14.7%
2014 General Election for California State Senator, 34th District
Janet Nguyen (R), 95,792 - 58.1%
Jose Solorio (D), 69,220 - 41.9%

2018 California State Senate

2020 California State Assembly

References

External links
Official Campaign web site
Official State government web site
Join California Janet Nguyen

1976 births
Republican Party California state senators
California city council members
Living people
Orange County Supervisors
People from Ho Chi Minh City
People from Garden Grove, California
University of California, Irvine alumni
Vietnamese emigrants to the United States
Vietnamese refugees
Women state legislators in California
American women of Vietnamese descent in politics
Women city councillors in California
21st-century American politicians
21st-century American women politicians
Vietnamese anti-communists
Asian-American city council members
California politicians of Vietnamese descent
Asian conservatism in the United States